John Leggott College is a sixth form college on West Common Lane, in Old Brumby, Scunthorpe, North Lincolnshire, England.

History

Technical school
The earliest predecessor to the college was known as Scunthorpe Technical High School on Cole Street, run by Lindsey County Council Education Committee, based in Lincoln, although its Scunthorpe Divisional Executive was based on Wells Street; this followed on from the Central School in Scunthorpe. There were 500 boys and girls, and the headmaster was John R. Leggott BSc. It had a sixth form. The school focused on technical skills which were of help to Scunthorpe's steel industry, the main employer at the time and for many years afterwards.

Grammar school
The college was founded in 1958 as John Leggott Grammar School with 600 pupils aged 11–18. Plans from the new site of the grammar school were ready by August 1960, to start building in April 1961, and to open by 1963. The building was to cost £250,000, with an octagonal hall and a swimming pool, but would be largely a copy of the Bottesford Grammar School (renamed the Frederick Gough Grammar School in 1960).  Plans for comprehensive education in Scunthorpe were being discussed, and the original plan was for comprehensive education by 1965, with the three grammar schools being 11-19 schools, and the secondary modern schools being for ages 11-16. By December 1962, the cost would be £300,000.

The new grammar school opened on Tuesday 10 September 1963. The next phase would open in June 1964, for a roll of 720, with six science laboratories, woodwork and metalwork rooms, and a housecraft room. The coat of arms featured Brumby Hall. The staircase and balustrading was made by Metalcraft of Stamford. The first headteacher was Eric Charlesworth. The grammar school catchment area was from the north-east of the borough, towards Winterton and beyond.

Sixth Form College
The Sixth Form College was established in September 1968 due to a reorganisation of education in Scunthorpe. It is commonly known as JLC and now has more than 1600 students. In 1971 there were 500 sixth formers, and by 1973 it was run by the Borough of Scunthorpe Education Committee, in April 1974 run by the Scunthorpe Division of Humberside Education Committee, and in April 1996 by North Lincolnshire. On 30 November 2010 a number of students from the college participated in the nationwide 2010 UK student protests against the rise in University Tuition Fees. In 2010 John Leggott principal Nic Dakin retired from his role to represent the Scunthorpe constituency for the Labour Party. David Vasse succeeded him as principal in 2010, to be replaced in 2016 by new principal Leon Riley.

Notable alumni

 Martin Simpson, guitarist (1969–70)
 James McDonald, polymath (1970–72)
 Phil Neale , cricketer (1970–72)
 Gordon Dougan  Head of Pathogen Research at the Wellcome Sanger Institute in Cambridgeshire
 Kevin Doyle, actor (1977–79)
 Nina Nannar, ITN correspondent (1980–82)
 Darren Bett, BBC weather forecaster (1984–86)
 Sheridan Smith OBE, actress (1997)
 Ryan J. Brown, Screenwriter (2008-2010)
 Stephen Fretwell, songwriter (1998–2000)
 Matt Sparrow, footballer until 2010 for Scunthorpe United (1998–2000)
 Lt Lee Vessey, the Royal Navy's youngest ever captain (27), taking command of HMS Puncher (1998–2000)
 Jen Pringle, presenter since 2006 of Milkshake! (2000–02)

John Leggott Grammar School

 Sir Ralph Waller, Principal from 1988-2018 of Harris Manchester College, Oxford, and knighted in the 2018 Birthday Honours (in the sixth form only from c.1962-64)
 Roger Davies, Philip Wetton Professor of Astrophysics since 2002 at the University of Oxford, and Professor from 1994–2002 of Astronomy at Durham University (1965–72)
 Mark Millar, former Chief Executive from 2010 of Milton Keynes University Hospital NHS Foundation Trust, and from 2007-10 of Hinchingbrooke Health Care NHS Trust (1965-72)

Scunthorpe Technical High School
 Wallace L. W. Sargent FRS (from Winterton), astrophysicist, and Director from 1997-2000 of the Palomar Observatory, married to Anneila Sargent (1946–53)

Former teachers
 Christina Baxter CBE (1969-73, Head of Religious Education from 1973-76)
 Richard Vergette, playwright

References

External links
 John Leggott College official website
 EduBase

News items
 College principal chosen as Labour candidate for Scunthorpe in November 2009

1963 establishments in England
Education in Scunthorpe
Educational institutions established in 1963
Learning and Skills Beacons
Sixth form colleges in Lincolnshire